Enroth is a surname. Notable people with the surname include:

 Christina Enroth-Cugell (1919–2016), vision scientist
 Jhonas Enroth (born 1988), Swedish ice hockey player
 Ronald Enroth (born 1938), American sociologist

See also
 A fictional continent in 3DO's Might and Magic series